Jacob Bullock (born c. 1994) is an American basketball head coach who is currently an assistant coach of Western Michigan Broncos under head coach Clayton Bates. He played college basketball at Aquinas College, where he ranked sixth all-time in points in school history.

Career 
On June 29, 2020, it was reported that Bullock, after spending a few years as the director of basketball operations for the Western Michigan Broncos, he would be promoted to being an assistant coach.

Bates, in an interview, stated, "Jake is passionate about the teaching the game of basketball and his ability to communicate with our student-athletes makes him perfect for this role."

References

External links
Jacob Bullock Coaching profile

1994 births
Living people
American men's basketball coaches
American men's basketball players
Guards (basketball)
Western Michigan Broncos men's basketball coaches